Clay Hill is a mountain in Barnstable County, Massachusetts. Shootflying Hill is located east and White Hill is located north of Clay Hill.

References

Mountains of Massachusetts
Mountains of Barnstable County, Massachusetts